Hans-Adam, Prince of Liechtenstein, may refer to:

Hans-Adam I, Prince of Liechtenstein (1657 - 1712), Prince of Liechtenstein 
Hans-Adam II, Prince of Liechtenstein (born 1945), Prince of Liechtenstein